Sepp Heckelmiller (born 5 November 1943 in Bad Hindelang) is a German former alpine skier who competed in the 1968 Winter Olympics and 1972 Winter Olympics.

External links
 sports-reference.com

1943 births
Living people
German male alpine skiers
Olympic alpine skiers of West Germany
Alpine skiers at the 1968 Winter Olympics
Alpine skiers at the 1972 Winter Olympics
People from Oberallgäu
Sportspeople from Swabia (Bavaria)
20th-century German people